George William Whitehurst (May 18, 1891 – January 13, 1974) was a Florida state court judge and later a United States district judge of the United States District Court for the Northern District of Florida and the United States District Court for the Southern District of Florida.

Education and career

Born in Wauchula, Florida, Whitehurst received a Bachelor of Laws from the Fredric G. Levin College of Law at the University of Florida. He entered private practice from 1915 to 1916. He was a county judge in DeSoto County, Florida from 1917 to 1919, and a Judge of the Twelfth Judicial Circuit Court of Florida from 1919 to 1947.

Federal judicial service

Whitehurst was nominated by President Harry S. Truman on January 30, 1950, to the United States District Court for the Northern District of Florida and the United States District Court for the Southern District of Florida, to a new joint seat authorized by 63 Stat. 493. He was confirmed by the United States Senate on February 21, 1950, and received his commission on February 23, 1950. He served as Chief Judge of the Southern District from 1959 to 1961. He assumed senior status on June 30, 1961. His service terminated on January 13, 1974, due to his death.

References

Sources
 

1891 births
1974 deaths
People from Wauchula, Florida
Florida state court judges
Judges of the United States District Court for the Southern District of Florida
Judges of the United States District Court for the Northern District of Florida
United States district court judges appointed by Harry S. Truman
20th-century American judges
Fredric G. Levin College of Law alumni